Joe Perham (October 26, 1932 – August 29, 2013) was an American humorist, known for his "Down East Maine" humor. Perham's humor style was an influence on Tim Sample. Sample has described Perham as a "seriously funny guy with a professionally honed native wit, which inevitably leaves his audiences weak from laughter."

Early life
Joe was born in West Paris, Maine, and is one of thirteen children in the Perham family. When Perham was eight, his family moved to a 200-acre farm overlooking West Paris. Perham attended Colby College in Waterville, Maine majoring in English and education.  After receiving his BA from Colby, he attained advanced degrees at the University of Maine at Orono.  While at Colby, Perham was a member of the Phi Beta Kappa Society, and earned money by working in the feldspar mines for three summers and running a jackhammer the fourth summer for a construction firm, earning 68 cents an hour in the mine and $2.00 an hour running a pneumatic drill. Perham later became a high school English teacher and also taught speech and drama. At age 50, Perham retired from teaching to begin his career as a storyteller and humorist.

Career
Throughout his 25-year career, Perham performed throughout Maine, performing as various characters. His discography consists of over 15 releases. He has appeared in two films: as a mill inspector in Graveyard Shift (1990), based on the novel by Stephen King, and with his wife Margaret Perham (Grover), in Bed & Breakfast (1992), with Roger Moore and Colleen Dewhurst.

Personal life
Perham retired following his diagnosis with Alzheimer's disease, and lived in West Paris, Maine with his wife Margaret, who often appeared in his material,  until his death in August 2013.

Filmography
Bed & Breakfast (1992)
Graveyard Shift (1990)

References

External links
Official Website

1932 births
American male comedians
American humorists
Colby College alumni
People from Lewiston, Maine
People from West Paris, Maine
University of Maine alumni
2013 deaths
Writers from Maine